Zion Church may refer to:

Buildings 
Germany
 Zion's Church, Worpswede, Lower Saxony

Greenland
 Zion Church, Ilulissat, Greenland

India
 Zion Church, Tharangambadi, Tamil Nadu

Jerusalem
 Church of Zion, Jerusalem, Roman-era church or synagogue on Mount Zion, of which 4th-century remains are visible

United States
 Zion Church (Rome, New York)
 Zion Stone Church, Augustaville, Pennsylvania
 Zion Church (Brownsville, Tennessee)

Institutions 
 Zionites (Germany), 18th-century sect in Ronsdorf, Duchy of Berg
 Godbeites (1870-1880s), officially the Church of Zion, a Latter Day Saints grouping
 Christ Community Church in Zion, Illinois (est. 1896), formerly the Christian Catholic Church or Christian Catholic Apostolic Church, an evangelical non-denominational church
 Zionist churches, a group of Christian denominations that derive from the Christian Catholic Apostolic Church of Zion, Illinois, starting with the arrival of Zionist missionaries in South Africa in 1904
 Zion Christian Church of southern Africa (est. 1924), the largest Zionist church
 Zion Christian Church (Japan) (est. 1934)

See also 
 Church of Zion (disambiguation)
 Mount Zion Church (disambiguation)
 Zion Baptist Church (disambiguation)
 Zion Evangelical Lutheran Church (disambiguation)
 Zion Lutheran Church (disambiguation)
 Zionism (disambiguation)
 Zion (disambiguation)